Joakim Sundström is a Swedish supervising sound editor, sound designer and musician. 

Sundström was born on February 27, 1965, in the city of Gävle in Sweden and brought up in Buchanan, Liberia on the West African Atlantic coast. He collaborates regularly with British director Michael Winterbottom. Married to British painter Dee Ferris. They have a daughter, Tova Sundström, and a son, Ruben Sundström. He currently resides between London and Brighton, England.

Filmography

 Robinson in Space (1997)  
 Dance of the Wind (1997)  
 Souvenir (1998)  
 Simon Magus (1999)  
 I Could Read the Sky (1999)
 My Kingdom (2001)  
 In This World (2002)  
 Heartlands (2002) 
 24 Hour Party People (2002) 
 Octane (2003)  
 Code 46 (2003)  
 Touching the Void (2003) 
 Birth (2004) 
 9 Songs (2004)  
 Yes (2004) 
 Enduring Love (2004)  
 Isolation (2005)  
 MirrorMask (2005)  
 The Piano Tuner of Earthquakes (2005) 
 A Cock and Bull Story (2005)  
 Wilderness (2006) 
 Song of Songs (2006)  
 The Road to Guantánamo (2006) 
 The Constant Gardener (2006)  
 Scott Walker: 30 Century Man (2006) 
 The History Boys (2006) 
 Deep Water (2006) 
 Becoming Jane (2007)  
 A Mighty Heart (2007) 
 Sleep Furiously (2008)  
 Genova (2008) 
 Cheri (2008) 
 Fish Tank (2009) 
 Skeletons (2010) 
 The Killer Inside Me (2010) 
 Tamara Drewe (2010) 
 Men Who Swim (2010)
 The Trip (2010) 
 Sønner av Norge (2011) 
 Trishna (2011) 
 Welcome to the Punch (2012) 
 Lay the Favorite (2012) 
 Berberian Sound Studio (2012) 
 Seven Psychopaths (2012) 
 The Look of Love (2013) 
 Three Billboards Outside Ebbing, Missouri (2017)

TV productions

 Cheek to Cheek (1997) 
 The Sandman (2000)  
 Barnen på Luna (2000) 
 Herr von Hancken (2000)  
 Bekännelsen (2001)  
 Återkomsten (2001) 
 Tracker (2001) 
 Andrew and Jeremy Get Married (2004)  
 Top Spot (2004) 
 A Time Comes (2004)
 The Trip (2010) 
 The Trip to Italy (2010) 
 The Marriage of Reason & Squalor'' (2015)

Selected awards & nominations

 2003 – British Independent Film Awards – nominated 
 2005 – MPSE Golden Reel Awards – nominated 
 2005 – The International Press Academy Satellite Awards – nominated 
 2006 – MPSE Golden Reel Awards – nominated 
 2006 – British Academy Film Awards – nominated 
 2012 – British Independent Film Awards – won 
 2012 – London Film Critics' Circle – nominated

References

External links

1965 births
Living people
Swedish male musicians
European Film Awards winners (people)
Alumni of Sheffield Hallam University
People from Gävle
People from Buchanan, Liberia
Sound editors
Sound designers